Surrey-Cloverdale is a provincial electoral district for the Legislative Assembly of British Columbia, Canada.

Demographics

Geography

1999 Redistribution
Changes to Surrey-Cloverdale include
removal of northwesternmost half to Surrey-Tynehead
inclusion of a western panhandle from Surrey-Newton

History 
This riding has elected the following Members of Legislative Assembly:

Member of Legislative Assembly 
Currently, its MLA is Mike Starchuk, who represents the British Columbia New Democratic Party.

Election results 

^ Unity totals compared to FCP

|}

References

External links 
BC Stats - 2001
Results of 2001 election (pdf)
2001 Expenditures
Results of 1996 election
1996 Expenditures
Results of 1991 election
1991 Expenditures
Website of the Legislative Assembly of British Columbia

British Columbia provincial electoral districts
Politics of Surrey, British Columbia
Provincial electoral districts in Greater Vancouver and the Fraser Valley